Glenelg North is a seaside suburb of Adelaide, South Australia. It is located in both the City of Holdfast Bay and the City of West Torrens.

Demographics

The 2011 Census by the Australian Bureau of Statistics counted 5,699 persons in Glenelg North on census night. Of these, 50.7% were male and 49.3% were female.

The majority of residents (72.9%) are of Australian birth, with the other common census response being England (7.6%).

The age distribution of Glenelg North residents is skewed towards a slightly higher age bracket than the greater Australian population. 72.9% of residents were over 25 years in 2006, compared to the Australian average of 66.5%; and 27.1% were younger than 25 years, compared to the Australian average of 33.5%.

Community
The local newspaper is the Guardian Messenger. Other regional and national newspapers such as The Advertiser and The Australian are also available.

Schools
St Leonards Primary School, located on Jervois Street, is the local public school.

Attractions
Glenelg North is the site of the Patawalonga boat haven and The Old Gum Tree.

It was home to a replica of the vessel , the ship that brought settlers to the state. The replica was fitted out as a restaurant.

Shopping and dining
The Jetty Road shopping and dining precinct is a short walk from the suburb.

Parks
There are parks and green spaces throughout Glenelg North.

Beach
Glenelg North Beach extends along the coastal length of the suburb until reaching neighbouring suburb West Beach.

Transport

Roads
The suburb is serviced by the following main roads:
 Anzac Highway, connecting Adelaide to Glenelg
 Tapleys Hill Road, running north–south from Queenstown to Glenelg

Public transport
The suburb is serviced by bus routes, run by the Adelaide Metro:

See also
 List of Adelaide suburbs

References

External links

City of West Torrens
City of Holdfast Bay
2006 ABS Census Data by Location
St Leonards Primary School

Suburbs of Adelaide
Beaches of South Australia